Vanda Ferreira Gomes (born 7 November 1988 in Matelândia, Paraná) is a Brazilian athlete who specialises in the sprinting events. She won the silver medal in the 200 metres at the 2006 World Junior Championships. She has personal bests of 11.64 in the 100 metres (2012) and 23.06 in the 200 metres (2008).

She was banned from competition for two years due to a failed out-of-competition doping test on 25 September 2014. The ban ends 24 September 2016.

Competition record

See also
List of doping cases in athletics

References

1988 births
Living people
Sportspeople from Paraná (state)
Brazilian female sprinters
Pan American Games athletes for Brazil
Pan American Games gold medalists for Brazil
Pan American Games medalists in athletics (track and field)
Athletes (track and field) at the 2011 Pan American Games
Doping cases in athletics
Brazilian sportspeople in doping cases
South American Games gold medalists for Brazil
South American Games silver medalists for Brazil
South American Games bronze medalists for Brazil
South American Games medalists in athletics
Competitors at the 2010 South American Games
Medalists at the 2011 Pan American Games
20th-century Brazilian women
21st-century Brazilian women